Auderville is a former commune on the north coast of the Manche department in the Normandy region in northwestern France. On 1 January 2017, it was merged into the new commune La Hague.

History

On 22 February 1941, an RAF reconnaissance Spitfire aircraft from RAF Benson in south Oxfordshire with Flying Officer William Kenneth Manifould (28 June 1918 - 10 April 1941) of No. 1 Photographic Reconnaissance Unit RAF spotted the Freya radar nearby.

Geography
The commune contains four villages, Goury, Laye, La Valette and La Roche, as well as a lighthouse. It is separated from Alderney by the Raz Blanchard, and has a small and not easily accessible port at Goury.

Cadomian granit crop out in Auderville.

Population

Heraldry

See also
Communes of the Manche department

References

Former communes of Manche
History of telecommunications in France
History of telecommunications in Germany
Populated coastal places in France
Port cities and towns on the French Atlantic coast
Telecommunications in World War II